Michael Dennis Dupree (born May 29, 1953) is former Major League Baseball pitcher.

Dupree pitched and played the outfield at Fresno City College. Nonetheless, the Padres selected him in the 1973 Major League Baseball draft with the intention of having him play the infield.

He batted and threw right-handed. He also played a season in Japan for the Hiroshima Toyo Carp as an outfielder in 1980.

A single in his only at-bat left Dupree with a rare MLB career batting average of 1.000.

References

External links

1953 births
Living people
Baseball players from Kansas
Fresno City Rams baseball players
San Diego Padres players
Hawaii Islanders players
American expatriate baseball players in Japan
Nippon Professional Baseball outfielders
Hiroshima Toyo Carp players
Alexandria Aces players
Walla Walla Padres players
Major League Baseball pitchers